Bob Circosta is an American businessman and TV host. He is television's first ever home shopping host and has achieved over one billion dollars in personal product sales on live television. His offices are in Clearwater, Florida, just a few miles from the Home Shopping Network (HSN)'s corporate building.

Career
In 1977, Circosta began advertising can openers on his radio talk-show, and all stock he had was sold out within an hour. Recognizing the vast sales potential, Bud Paxson, the owner of the station where Circosta's show aired, then founded a local home shopping cable station, and later launched nationwide with the HSN. Bob Circosta was their first ever home shopping host, also becoming one of the world's most prolific, most identifiable salesmen in the process. Circosta still makes regular appearances on HSN and also hosts the syndicated TV program What a Great Idea! nationwide, where he scours the landscape for eye-catching new products and inventions to debut.

Given his historic sales accomplishments and familiarity with television viewers, Circosta is one of the most sought-after lecturers and business consultants. He regularly appears at corporate conferences and sales conventions in the entrepreneurial world, including the Enlightened Wealth Institute, CEO Space and T. Harv Eker's World's Greatest Marketing Seminar.

References
What A Great Idea It Turned Out To Be Selling Can Openers On The Radio The Tampa Tribune
A Man. A Plan. A Can Opener. ClickZ Network
"Can You Believe This Price?" Time
Bob Circosta Interview Media Talk
It started with 112 can openers St. Petersburg Times
"Home Shopping Game" Internet Movie Database
What a Great Idea! Circosta TV homepage
Media Zone: Lord of the Pitch Response
Bob Circosta Communications, Inc. Circosta Communications homepage

Year of birth missing (living people)
Living people
Businesspeople from Tampa, Florida
American businesspeople in retailing
American game show hosts
American infotainers
American motivational speakers
Businesspeople from Florida